The 2002–03 Pittsburgh Penguins season was the Penguins' 36th season. The team finished fifth and last in the Atlantic Division and did not qualify for the Stanley Cup playoffs.

Off-season

Regular season
The Penguins were shut out an NHL-high ten times, tied with the Calgary Flames, Minnesota Wild and Nashville Predators.

Final standings

Schedule and results

|-  style="background:#fcf;"
| 1 || 10 || Toronto Maple Leafs || 6–0 || Pittsburgh Penguins || Civic Arena (15309) || 0–1–0–0 || 0 || 
|-  style="background:#cfc;"
| 2 || 12 || New York Rangers || 0–6 || Pittsburgh Penguins || Civic Arena (14813) || 1–1–0–0 || 2 || 
|-  style="background:#cfc;"
| 3 || 14 || Pittsburgh Penguins || 5–4 || Toronto Maple Leafs || Air Canada Centre (18843) || 2–1–0–0 || 4 || 
|-  style="background:#cfc;"
| 4 || 16 || Atlanta Thrashers || 2–3 || Pittsburgh Penguins || Civic Arena (12161) || 3–1–0–0 || 6 || 
|-  style="background:#fff;"
| 5 || 19 || Tampa Bay Lightning || 3–3 || Pittsburgh Penguins || Civic Arena (16106) || 3–1–1–0 || 7 || 
|-  style="background:#fff;"
| 6 || 22 || Pittsburgh Penguins || 3–3 || Montreal Canadiens || Bell Centre (19895) || 3–1–2–0 || 8 || 
|-  style="background:#fcf;"
| 7 || 25 || Pittsburgh Penguins || 3–7 || Detroit Red Wings || Joe Louis Arena (20058) || 3–2–2–0 || 8 || 
|-  style="background:#cfc;"
| 8 || 26 || Buffalo Sabres || 2–5 || Pittsburgh Penguins || Civic Arena (16188) || 4–2–2–0 || 10 || 
|-  style="background:#cfc;"
| 9 || 28 || Washington Capitals || 2–3 || Pittsburgh Penguins || Civic Arena (14303) || 5–2–2–0 || 12 || 
|-  style="background:#cfc;"
| 10 || 30 || Pittsburgh Penguins || 4–1 || Ottawa Senators || Canadian Tire Centre (17987) || 6–2–2–0 || 14 || 
|-

|-  style="background:#cfc;"
| 11 || 2 || Tampa Bay Lightning || 3–5 || Pittsburgh Penguins || Civic Arena (17108) || 7–2–2–0 || 16 || 
|-  style="background:#ffc;"
| 12 || 6 || Pittsburgh Penguins || 3–4 OT || Florida Panthers || BB&T Center (14244) || 7–2–2–1 || 17 || 
|-  style="background:#fcf;"
| 13 || 8 || Pittsburgh Penguins || 1–4 || Tampa Bay Lightning || Amalie Arena (18741) || 7–3–2–1 || 17 || 
|-  style="background:#fcf;"
| 14 || 9 || Pittsburgh Penguins || 2–3 || Carolina Hurricanes || PNC Arena (18730) || 7–4–2–1 || 17 || 
|-  style="background:#fff;"
| 15 || 14 || Pittsburgh Penguins || 1–1 || Minnesota Wild || Xcel Energy Center (18568) || 7–4–3–1 || 18 || 
|-  style="background:#fcf;"
| 16 || 16 || New York Islanders || 3–2 || Pittsburgh Penguins || Civic Arena (15723) || 7–5–3–1 || 18 || 
|-  style="background:#ffc;"
| 17 || 18 || Pittsburgh Penguins || 4–5 OT || Montreal Canadiens || Bell Centre (21273) || 7–5–3–2 || 19 || 
|-  style="background:#ffc;"
| 18 || 20 || Montreal Canadiens || 3–2 OT || Pittsburgh Penguins || Civic Arena (13549) || 7–5–3–3 || 20 || 
|-  style="background:#cfc;"
| 19 || 22 || Pittsburgh Penguins || 3–1 || Atlanta Thrashers || Philips Arena (17375) || 8–5–3–3 || 22 || 
|-  style="background:#cfc;"
| 20 || 23 || San Jose Sharks || 1–4 || Pittsburgh Penguins || Civic Arena (16958) || 9–5–3–3 || 24 || 
|-  style="background:#cfc;"
| 21 || 27 || Philadelphia Flyers || 2–7 || Pittsburgh Penguins || Civic Arena (16385) || 10–5–3–3 || 26 || 
|-  style="background:#cfc;"
| 22 || 29 || Pittsburgh Penguins || 4–1 || Buffalo Sabres || First Niagara Center (15733) || 11–5–3–3 || 28 || 
|-  style="background:#fcf;"
| 23 || 30 || Boston Bruins || 3–2 || Pittsburgh Penguins || Civic Arena (15111) || 11–6–3–3 || 28 || 
|-

|-  style="background:#fcf;"
| 24 || 3 || Washington Capitals || 4–1 || Pittsburgh Penguins || Civic Arena (11640) || 11–7–3–3 || 28 || 
|-  style="background:#fcf;"
| 25 || 6 || Pittsburgh Penguins || 1–3 || New Jersey Devils || Izod Center (16860) || 11–8–3–3 || 28 || 
|-  style="background:#fcf;"
| 26 || 7 || New York Islanders || 6–3 || Pittsburgh Penguins || Civic Arena (13170) || 11–9–3–3 || 28 || 
|-  style="background:#fcf;"
| 27 || 10 || Pittsburgh Penguins || 2–4 || Toronto Maple Leafs || Air Canada Centre (19388) || 11–10–3–3 || 28 || 
|-  style="background:#fcf;"
| 28 || 12 || Pittsburgh Penguins || 2–5 || San Jose Sharks || SAP Center at San Jose (17496) || 11–11–3–3 || 28 || 
|-  style="background:#ffc;"
| 29 || 14 || Pittsburgh Penguins || 2–3 OT || Los Angeles Kings || Staples Center (18184) || 11–11–3–4 || 29 || 
|-  style="background:#fcf;"
| 30 || 15 || Pittsburgh Penguins || 0–5 || Mighty Ducks of Anaheim || Honda Center (16542) || 11–12–3–4 || 29 || 
|-  style="background:#fcf;"
| 31 || 17 || Pittsburgh Penguins || 2–5 || Phoenix Coyotes || America West Arena (13174) || 11–13–3–4 || 29 || 
|-  style="background:#fcf;"
| 32 || 19 || New Jersey Devils || 3–1 || Pittsburgh Penguins || Civic Arena (14220) || 11–14–3–4 || 29 || 
|-  style="background:#cfc;"
| 33 || 21 || Calgary Flames || 0–2 || Pittsburgh Penguins || Civic Arena (12571) || 12–14–3–4 || 31 || 
|-  style="background:#cfc;"
| 34 || 23 || Buffalo Sabres || 2–5 || Pittsburgh Penguins || Civic Arena (16569) || 13–14–3–4 || 33 || 
|-  style="background:#cfc;"
| 35 || 26 || Pittsburgh Penguins || 6–1 || New York Rangers || Madison Square Garden (IV) (18200) || 14–14–3–4 || 35 || 
|-  style="background:#cfc;"
| 36 || 28 || Montreal Canadiens || 2–3 || Pittsburgh Penguins || Civic Arena (16109) || 15–14–3–4 || 37 || 
|-  style="background:#ffc;"
| 37 || 30 || Atlanta Thrashers || 3–2 OT || Pittsburgh Penguins || Civic Arena (16989) || 15–14–3–5 || 38 || 
|-  style="background:#fcf;"
| 38 || 31 || Pittsburgh Penguins || 2–5 || Columbus Blue Jackets || Nationwide Arena (18136) || 15–15–3–5 || 38 || 
|-

|-  style="background:#cfc;"
| 39 || 3 || Pittsburgh Penguins || 4–1 || Atlanta Thrashers || Philips Arena (14177) || 16–15–3–5 || 40 || 
|-  style="background:#cfc;"
| 40 || 4 || New York Islanders || 2–3 OT || Pittsburgh Penguins || Civic Arena (14331) || 17–15–3–5 || 42 || 
|-  style="background:#fcf;"
| 41 || 7 || Pittsburgh Penguins || 3–6 || New York Islanders || Nassau Coliseum (14857) || 17–16–3–5 || 42 || 
|-  style="background:#fcf;"
| 42 || 9 || Toronto Maple Leafs || 4–2 || Pittsburgh Penguins || Civic Arena (13889) || 17–17–3–5 || 42 || 
|-  style="background:#fcf;"
| 43 || 11 || New York Rangers || 3–1 || Pittsburgh Penguins || Civic Arena (14769) || 17–18–3–5 || 42 || 
|-  style="background:#cfc;"
| 44 || 13 || Pittsburgh Penguins || 2–1 || Boston Bruins || TD Garden (15672) || 18–18–3–5 || 44 || 
|-  style="background:#cfc;"
| 45 || 15 || Pittsburgh Penguins || 2–0 || Carolina Hurricanes || PNC Arena (15265) || 19–18–3–5 || 46 || 
|-  style="background:#cfc;"
| 46 || 17 || Pittsburgh Penguins || 3–2 || Tampa Bay Lightning || Amalie Arena (18202) || 20–18–3–5 || 48 || 
|-  style="background:#fcf;"
| 47 || 18 || Pittsburgh Penguins || 0–3 || Florida Panthers || BB&T Center (18313) || 20–19–3–5 || 48 || 
|-  style="background:#fff;"
| 48 || 21 || Pittsburgh Penguins || 0–0 || Buffalo Sabres || First Niagara Center (13858) || 20–19–4–5 || 49 || 
|-  style="background:#fcf;"
| 49 || 23 || Boston Bruins || 4–1 || Pittsburgh Penguins || Civic Arena (13271) || 20–20–4–5 || 49 || 
|-  style="background:#cfc;"
| 50 || 25 || Chicago Blackhawks || 3–5 || Pittsburgh Penguins || Civic Arena (16958) || 21–20–4–5 || 51 || 
|-  style="background:#fcf;"
| 51 || 28 || Pittsburgh Penguins || 2–5 || New York Islanders || Nassau Coliseum (14246) || 21–21–4–5 || 51 || 
|-  style="background:#fcf;"
| 52 || 30 || Pittsburgh Penguins || 1–2 || Washington Capitals || Verizon Center (18277) || 21–22–4–5 || 51 || 
|-

|-  style="background:#fcf;"
| 53 || 4 || Vancouver Canucks || 3–2 || Pittsburgh Penguins || Civic Arena (13202) || 21–23–4–5 || 51 || 
|-  style="background:#fcf;"
| 54 || 6 || Florida Panthers || 6–0 || Pittsburgh Penguins || Civic Arena (12231) || 21–24–4–5 || 51 || 
|-  style="background:#cfc;"
| 55 || 8 || Pittsburgh Penguins || 5–2 || Boston Bruins || TD Garden (17565) || 22–24–4–5 || 53 || 
|-  style="background:#fcf;"
| 56 || 12 || Ottawa Senators || 3–0 || Pittsburgh Penguins || Civic Arena (14197) || 22–25–4–5 || 53 || 
|-  style="background:#fcf;"
| 57 || 14 || Pittsburgh Penguins || 0–1 || New York Rangers || Madison Square Garden (IV) (18200) || 22–26–4–5 || 53 || 
|-  style="background:#cfc;"
| 58 || 15 || Pittsburgh Penguins || 4–1 || New Jersey Devils || Izod Center (18235) || 23–26–4–5 || 55 || 
|-  style="background:#cfc;"
| 59 || 18 || Edmonton Oilers || 3–4 OT || Pittsburgh Penguins || Civic Arena (13552) || 24–26–4–5 || 57 || 
|-  style="background:#fcf;"
| 60 || 20 || Colorado Avalanche || 5–2 || Pittsburgh Penguins || Civic Arena (13751) || 24–27–4–5 || 57 || 
|-  style="background:#cfc;"
| 61 || 22 || St. Louis Blues || 1–2 OT || Pittsburgh Penguins || Civic Arena (14718) || 25–27–4–5 || 59 || 
|-  style="background:#fcf;"
| 62 || 23 || New Jersey Devils || 4–3 || Pittsburgh Penguins || Civic Arena (17148) || 25–28–4–5 || 59 || 
|-  style="background:#fcf;"
| 63 || 25 || Los Angeles Kings || 5–3 || Pittsburgh Penguins || Civic Arena (11736) || 25–29–4–5 || 59 || 
|-  style="background:#fcf;"
| 64 || 27 || Pittsburgh Penguins || 0–6 || Nashville Predators || Bridgestone Arena (13581) || 25–30–4–5 || 59 || 
|-

|-  style="background:#fcf;"
| 65 || 1 || Pittsburgh Penguins || 1–4 || Colorado Avalanche || Pepsi Center (18007) || 25–31–4–5 || 59 || 
|-  style="background:#fcf;"
| 66 || 2 || Pittsburgh Penguins || 1–3 || Dallas Stars || American Airlines Center (18532) || 25–32–4–5 || 59 || 
|-  style="background:#fcf;"
| 67 || 4 || Phoenix Coyotes || 4–1 || Pittsburgh Penguins || Civic Arena (13686) || 25–33–4–5 || 59 || 
|-  style="background:#fcf;"
| 68 || 6 || Carolina Hurricanes || 4–0 || Pittsburgh Penguins || Civic Arena (14812) || 25–34–4–5 || 59 || 
|-  style="background:#fcf;"
| 69 || 8 || Ottawa Senators || 5–1 || Pittsburgh Penguins || Civic Arena (14354) || 25–35–4–5 || 59 || 
|-  style="background:#fcf;"
| 70 || 9 || Pittsburgh Penguins || 2–4 || Ottawa Senators || Canadian Tire Centre (18500) || 25–36–4–5 || 59 || 
|-  style="background:#fff;"
| 71 || 12 || Nashville Predators || 2–2 || Pittsburgh Penguins || Civic Arena (17148) || 25–36–5–5 || 60 || 
|-  style="background:#fcf;"
| 72 || 15 || Philadelphia Flyers || 4–1 || Pittsburgh Penguins || Civic Arena (17032) || 25–37–5–5 || 60 || 
|-  style="background:#fcf;"
| 73 || 16 || Florida Panthers || 4–2 || Pittsburgh Penguins || Civic Arena (16958) || 25–38–5–5 || 60 || 
|-  style="background:#fcf;"
| 74 || 18 || Detroit Red Wings || 5–1 || Pittsburgh Penguins || Civic Arena (13840) || 25–39–5–5 || 60 || 
|-  style="background:#fcf;"
| 75 || 20 || Pittsburgh Penguins || 2–4 || Philadelphia Flyers || Wells Fargo Center (19487) || 25–40–5–5 || 60 || 
|-  style="background:#fcf;"
| 76 || 21 || Pittsburgh Penguins || 1–3 || New Jersey Devils || Izod Center (15401) || 25–41–5–5 || 60 || 
|-  style="background:#fff;"
| 77 || 23 || Pittsburgh Penguins || 1–1 || Chicago Blackhawks || United Center (16234) || 25–41–6–5 || 61 || 
|-  style="background:#cfc;"
| 78 || 26 || Pittsburgh Penguins || 3–1 || New York Rangers || Madison Square Garden (IV) (18200) || 26–41–6–5 || 63 || 
|-  style="background:#fcf;"
| 79 || 29 || Pittsburgh Penguins || 0–3 || Philadelphia Flyers || Wells Fargo Center (19654) || 26–42–6–5 || 63 || 
|-  style="background:#fcf;"
| 80 || 31 || Philadelphia Flyers || 6–1 || Pittsburgh Penguins || Civic Arena (12505) || 26–43–6–5 || 63 || 
|-

|-  style="background:#cfc;"
| 81 || 2 || Carolina Hurricanes || 2–3 || Pittsburgh Penguins || Civic Arena (15718) || 27–43–6–5 || 65 || 
|-  style="background:#fcf;"
| 82 || 5 || Pittsburgh Penguins || 3–5 || Washington Capitals || Verizon Center (18277) || 27–44–6–5 || 65 || 
|-

|- style="text-align:center;"
| Legend:       = Win       = Loss       = OT Loss       = Tie

Player statistics

Scoring
 Position abbreviations: C = Center; D = Defense; G = Goaltender; LW = Left Wing; RW = Right Wing
  = Joined team via a transaction (e.g., trade, waivers, signing) during the season. Stats reflect time with the Penguins only.
  = Left team via a transaction (e.g., trade, waivers, release) during the season. Stats reflect time with the Penguins only.

Goaltending

Awards and records

Awards

Transactions
The Penguins were involved in the following transactions from June 14, 2002, the day after the deciding game of the 2002 Stanley Cup Finals, through June 9, 2003, the day of the deciding game of the 2003 Stanley Cup Finals.

Trades

Players acquired

Players lost

Signings

Other

Draft picks

Pittsburgh Penguins' picks at the 2002 NHL Entry Draft.

Draft notes 
 Compensatory pick received for loss of Group III free agent Garth Snow.
 Compensatory pick received from NHL as compensation for Group III free agent Garth Snow per Michel Leduc.
 Compensatory pick received from NHL as compensation for Group III free agent Marc Bergevin.

See also
2002–03 NHL season

Notes

References

Pitts
Pitts
Pittsburgh Penguins seasons
Pitts
Pitts